Angelika Hellmann (later Keilig, born 10 April 1954) is a retired German gymnast. She competed at the 1972 and 1976 Summer Olympics in all artistic gymnastics events and won a silver and a bronze medal in the team competitions, respectively. Her best individual results were fifth place in the floor exercise in 1972 and on the balance beam in 1976. She won two more silver medals with the East German team, and an individual all-around bronze, at the world championships in 1970 and 1974. At the European championships, she won three medals in 1971 and 1973, in the vault and uneven bars.

Her father Rudi Hellmann was an East German sports official. She retired shortly after the 1976 Olympics and in 1979 began coaching at her club SC Dynamo Berlin. Later she became the head choreographer for the East German women's team (floor exercise). After retirement from coaching she worked as a fitness instructor at a hotel in Zinnowitz, Germany.

References

External links 
 

1954 births
Living people
Sportspeople from Halle (Saale)
People from Bezirk Halle
German female artistic gymnasts
Olympic gymnasts of East Germany
Gymnasts at the 1972 Summer Olympics
Gymnasts at the 1976 Summer Olympics
Medalists at the 1972 Summer Olympics
Olympic medalists in gymnastics
Olympic silver medalists for East Germany
Medalists at the World Artistic Gymnastics Championships
European champions in gymnastics
Recipients of the Patriotic Order of Merit in bronze
20th-century German women